The Salmon River is a  river in the Cascade Range in the U.S. state of Oregon that drains part of southwestern Mount Hood. The entire length of the river is a protected National Wild and Scenic River. Several portions are in protected wilderness. It is affluent to the Sandy River, a tributary of the Columbia River.

Course
The overall course is sickle-shaped with the point facing north at Mount Hood and the handle facing west.
The headwaters are on the Mount Hood's south face at the foot of Palmer Glacier east of Silcox Hut.  
As it descends below , it turns southwest, and continues under Oregon Route 35, elevation , just east of the junction with U.S. Route 26, and crosses under Route 26 as well.

The West Fork Salmon River begins in the Timberline Lodge ski area under the Pucci chairlift. It flows south-southwest and is joined by natural cold springs at the  level, continues south-southwest and crosses under Highway 26 just west of the Highway 35 junction.   Just after they cross Highway 26, the West Fork and Salmon River join, and a half mile (1 km) later, the Salmon is joined by the East Fork Salmon River which comes out of a steep valley just north of, and below, Barlow Pass.

At the south end, the river is joined by Ghost Creek, which enters from the left and turns west-southwest for about  before receiving Mud Creek, which flows from Trillium Lake and enters from the right.

A steep east–west gorge captures the Salmon River and collects several creeks—Wolf from the right; Inch, Draw String, and Linney from the left. These include Stein and Split (before Iron and Swift creeks enter from the left and Kinzel Creek from the right), then Little Niagara (before Goat Creek enters from the right), then Vanishing, Frustration, and Final Falls. Iron Creek, near its confluence with the Salmon River, flows over Hideaway Falls.

A half mile below Final Falls, Copper Creek joins from the left and, a mile later, Bighorn Creek joins from the left and the river leaves the wilderness area. From here the river flows  on a comparatively level grade, receiving Cheeney Creek from the left just above Welches.

The river then flows roughly parallel to Route 26 past Wemme, then goes through Wildwood Recreation Site near Wildwood. Receiving Boulder Creek from the left, it crosses (again) under Route 26 and merges with the Sandy River near the community of Brightwood.

Flora and fauna 
The lower canyons have black bear, blacktail deer, cougar, badger, fisher, and marten.  Dense western hemlock, Douglas-fir are mixed with western red cedar, red alder, and vine maple.

The rare Alaska cedar is found in patches around the Salmon River Meadows.

The upper reaches of the river support cutthroat trout. Downstream of the waterfalls, the river has excellent spawning habitat for steelhead, Chinook salmon, and coho salmon. The river is named for the fish (salmon).

Recreation

Boating
Whitewater enthusiasts sometimes run a stretch of the lower river that begins downstream of the Salmon–Huckleberry Wilderness boundary. The  run of "fairly continuous class 2 rapids with great wilderness scenery" begins at a bridge near a wilderness trailhead and ends at the Arrah-Wanna Road bridge. This stretch of water is rated class II+ to III (intermediate) on the International Scale of River Difficulty. Hazards include logs along the banks and a stretch of boulders ending in a  ledge.

Expert kayakers have rarely completed runs in the Salmon River gorge further upstream. Oregon Kayaking says, "The Salmon River Canyon may just be the Mount Everest of Oregon Kayaking. Huge, marginally portageable waterfalls combined with crumbly, near-vertical canyon walls and questionable rescue possibilities make this a very serious venture indeed." These gorge and waterfall runs have been rated class V to V+ (expert, extreme).

Camping
Alpine Campground lies to the east of Salmon River about halfway between it and the West Fork. The highest campground in the Mount Hood National Forest, it is near Timberline Lodge and offers access to trails for hiking and mountain biking. It has 16 sites for tent camping. Amenities include picnic tables and potable water. Open from early June through early September, the campground sometimes has snow in mid-summer.

Trillium Lake Campground, along Trillium Lake, west of the Salmon River and at the head of one of its tributaries, has more than 50 sites for tents and trailers along a forest road connecting to Route 26 near Government Camp. Amenities include drinking water, picnic tables, toilets, and access to lake and pond fishing, hiking and mountain biking, and non-motorized lake boating.

Open from late May to late September, the campground has sites for tents and recreational vehicles (RV)s, picnic tables, and access to hiking trails and rainbow trout fishing. It has vault toilets but no drinking water.

Wildwood Recreation Site is a  day-use area along the lower river near Wildwood and Route 26. Overseen by the Bureau of Land Management, the site has a variety of picnic tables, shelters, and kitchens, playing fields and courts, a wetland boardwalk, underwater viewing chamber, and an interpretive trail, as well as access to fishing, swimming, and other trails.

Hiking
The Salmon River West Trailhead, along Welches Road upstream of Green Canyon Campground, provides access to the Salmon–Huckleberry Wilderness via the Salmon River Trail. Down river from Salmon River West Trailhead, Old Salmon River Trail travels  to Old Salmon River Trailhead.

See also 
List of National Wild and Scenic Rivers
List of rivers of Oregon

References

External links

Sandy River Basin Watershed Council
National Wild and Scenic Rivers System

Rivers of Oregon
Wild and Scenic Rivers of the United States
Mount Hood
Rivers of Clackamas County, Oregon
Mount Hood National Forest